The 2018–19 Azerbaijan Cup was the 27th season of the annual cup competition in Azerbaijan.

First round

Quarterfinals

Semifinals

Final

Scorers

3 goals:
 Peyman Babaei - Sumgayit

2 goals:

 James Adeniyi - Gabala
 Ulvi Iskandarov - Sumgayit
 Pardis Fardjad-Azad - Zira
 Adil Naghiyev - Zira

1 goals:

 Davit Volkovi - Gabala
 Steeven Joseph-Monrose - Gabala
 Azamat Alakbərli - Keşla
 Vagif Javadov - Keşla
 Andre Clennon - Keşla
 Namik Alaskarov - Neftchi Baku
 Rahil Mammadov - Qarabağ
 Míchel - Qarabağ
 Dani Quintana - Qarabağ
 Emil Qasımov - Sabah
 Bakhtiyar Soltanov - Sabah
 Vitaliy Kvashuk - Sabah
 Agshin Gurbanli - Sabail
 Orsan Gurbanli - Sabail
 Ruslan Gurbanov - Sabail
 Aghabala Ramazanov - Sabail
 Tome Kitanovski - Sabail
 Suleyman Ahmadov - Sumgayit
 Shahriyar Aliyev - Sumgayit
 Pardis Fardjad-Azad - Sumgayit
 Nijat Gurbanov - Sumgayit
 Ali Babayev - Sumgayit
 Ilkin Muradov - Zira
 Chafik Tigroudja - Zira
 Julio Rodríguez - Zira

Own goals:
 Filip Ivanović (16 December 2018 vs Gabala)
 Adrian Scarlatache (19 December 2018 vs Sabail)

References

2018-19
Azerbaijan
Cup